William or Bill Strickland may refer to:

 William Strickland (bishop) (died 1419), English clergyman
 William Strickland (navigator) (died 1598), credited with introducing the turkey to England, later a Member of Parliament
 Sir William Strickland, 1st Baronet (c. 1596–1673), Member of Parliament during the English Civil War
 Sir William Strickland, 3rd Baronet (1665–1724), Member of Parliament for Yorkshire
 Sir William Strickland, 4th Baronet (c. 1686–1735), British statesman
 William Strickland (farmer) (1753–1834), gentleman farmer and writer
 William Strickland (architect) (1788–1854), American architect from Pennsylvania
 William Strickland (Conservative politician) (1880–1954), Member of Parliament for Coventry
 William Strickland (conductor) (1914–1991), American conductor and organist
 Bill Strickland (born 1947), American community leader, author, and CEO
 Bill Strickland (footballer, born 1864) (1864–1959), Australian rules football player and coach for Collingwood
 Bill Strickland (footballer, born 1882) (1882–1958), Australian rules football player for Carlton
 Bill Strickland (American football) (1898–1976), American football player
 Bill Strickland (baseball) (1908–2000), American Major League pitcher
 Bill Strickland (writer) (born 1964), American author and journalist primarily focused on cycling